Lee Mishkin (February 5, 1927 – June 19, 2001) was an American animator and director. He directed the short animated film Is It Always Right to Be Right?, which won the Academy Award for Best Animated Short Film in 1970. He was the founder of the Vancouver Institute of Media Arts (VanArts), an art school focusing on animation, design, acting and photography. During the 1980s and 1990s Mishkin served on the advisory board of the National Student Film Institute. On June 19, 2001, Mishkin died in his sleep of heart failure.

Filmography

References

External links
 Vancouver Institute of Media Arts
 

1927 births
2001 deaths
American animators
American film directors
American animated film directors
Directors of Best Animated Short Academy Award winners